Park Bo-ram (born March 1, 1994) is a South Korean singer. She took a part in Mnet's SuperStar K2 and finished in eighth place. Park made her debut with release digital single "Beautiful" featuring Zico on August 7, 2014. That year, she won Artist of the Year for August at the Gaon Chart K-Pop Awards and was nominated for Best New Artist at the Mnet Asian Music Awards, Golden Disk Awards, and Melon Music Awards.

Career

Pre-debut 
In 2010, Park Boram finished as the Top 8 on  SuperStar K2. Talking about her experience in the singing competition, she stated: "I also gained the experience of performing on stage through Superstar K2. I realized that I need to feel comfortable in order to not make mistakes." She signed and trained in Jellyfish Entertainment before moving to CJ E&M's subsidiary MMO Entertainment for her debut. In 2011, Park recorded the song "Always" for SBS's 49 Days soundtrack. At the end of 2011, Jellyfish Entertainment released a Christmas-themed single featuring the company's artists, including Park. In March 2014, she made a surprise appearance in Hong Dae Kwang's "Thank You My Love" music video. Before her debut, she gained attention for having lost 32 kg since her Superstar K2 days.

2014–present: Debut with Beautiful, Celepretty and Orange Moon 
Park Boram made her debuted with released digital single Beautiful featuring rapper Zico on August 7, 2014. She made official debuted stage at SBS Inkigayo on August 10, 2014. "Beautiful" peaked at number 2 on Gaon. On November 12, 2014, Park appeared in Natthew's music video for his single "Love Will Be Ok" as his love interest.

On January 22, 2015, Park released soundtrack "Falling" for drama Hyde, Jekyll, Me. On April 23, Park's first mini album Celepretty was released with same naming for the lead single. Her single reached to number 7 on Gaon. On May 15, Park released a single called "Super Body", which was to promote CJ's dietary drink "Fat Down", with her as their model. On June 19, she appeared in Mamamoo's "Um Oh Ah Yeh" music video. That month, she also released collaboration "Pretty Bae" with singer Lee Hyun. On September 21, Park featured in Park Kyung's solo track, "Ordinary Love", which peaked at number 3 on Gaon Digital charts. She and Eric Nam attended The Walk, a virtual experience event held at the Yongsan CGV in Seoul on October 12. Park performed as part of the line-up for KCON 2015 JEJU. On October 7, Park returned with release ballad single since her debut called "Sorry", which peaked at number 30. On November 28, Park released soundtrack "혜화동 (혹은 쌍문동) (Hyehwadong (Or Ssangmundong))" for drama Reply 1988.

Park released an acoustic single called "Dynamic Love" on April 21, 2016.

Park also appeared as a contestant on the singing competition program King of Mask Singer as "I Am Completely Shrill-Voiced".

On July 13, 2017, Park return to release her second mini album called Orange Moon with title track "넌 왜? (Why, You?)" featuring artist Samuel Seo.

On December 1, 2017, Park released soundtrack "꿈만 같아 (Like A Dream)" for drama Prison Playbook.

Park released a ballad single titled "애쓰지 마요 (Will Be Fine)" on February 13, 2018.

On April 6, 2018, Park Boram released a digital single titled "말려줘 (Please, Stop Me)", featuring Lil Boi of Geeks.

In October 2018, Park signed with new agency Huayi Brothers.

In December 2021, Park has signed with Xanadu Entertainment.

Personal life 
Park was born on March 1, 1994, in Chuncheon, South Korea. She has older and younger brothers. In 2010, her father died and on October 3, 2017, her mother died due to an illness.

On December 5, 2017, Park confirmed to be dating singer and actor Seo In-guk. They have been dating since 2015.

On May 23, 2018, reports said the two singers recently broke up, and their agencies confirmed, "Seo In Guk and Park Bo Ram broke up about a month ago." Reportedly, Seo In Guk and Park Bo Ram naturally grew apart before they decided to go their separate ways.

Discography

Extended plays

Singles

Promotional singles

Soundtrack appearances

Compilation appearances

Filmography

Film

Drama

Reality

Awards and nominations

References

External links

 Park Boram on Twitter
 Park Boram on Instagram
 Park Boram on Facebook

1994 births
Living people
South Korean women pop singers
K-pop singers
South Korean female idols
Superstar K participants
People from Chuncheon
21st-century South Korean singers
21st-century South Korean women singers